Domingos Gabriel Wisniewski CM (March 2, 1928 – July 21, 2010) was a Brazilian Roman Catholic prelate and bishop of the Roman Catholic Diocese of Apucarana, Brazil.

Notes

20th-century Roman Catholic bishops in Brazil
1928 births
2010 deaths
Roman Catholic bishops of Apucarana
Roman Catholic bishops of Cornélio Procópio